"Brand New Day" is a comic book storyline in The Amazing Spider-Man, published by Marvel Comics beginning in 2008. It chronicles the start of Spider-Man's adventures in the aftermath of the status quo-altering "One More Day" storyline, and continues afterwards into "Spider-Man: Big Time". Although the banner only runs across the front covers of #546-564 and the Spider-Man: Swing Shift (Director's Cut) one-shot (itself a reprint, with new material, of the Free Comic Book Day 2007: Spider-Man one-shot), "Brand New Day" is also used to refer to the entire 102-issue run of stories featured in Amazing Spider-Man #546-647 and accompanying tie-in series, one-shots, and annuals.

During this time, Marvel made The Amazing Spider-Man the company's sole Spider-Man title, upping its frequency of publication to three issues monthly and cancelling the other then-current Spider-Man titles The Sensational Spider-Man and Friendly Neighborhood Spider-Man, and inaugurated the series with a sequence of "back to basics" story arcs. This marks the first time since December 1976 (when Peter Parker, The Spectacular Spider-Man #1 was published) that only one regularly published title featured Spider-Man in its title.

Plot

The new status quo
Following the events of "One More Day", Spider-Man's marriage to Mary Jane Watson has been erased, resulting in adjustments to his own history. Spider-Man's secret identity has also been forgotten by everyone, including people who knew his identity before his public unmasking. Harry Osborn is again alive; he has been living in Europe for several years. Aunt May is alive and well and volunteers in a homeless shelter. Peter has his original mechanical webshooters. Although "some people" vaguely recall that Spider-Man unmasked himself during the events of Civil War, they do not remember whose face was under the mask, and even if this is brought to their attention, they soon cease to worry about it.

Brand New Day
Spider-Man has not been seen for one hundred days because of the Superhuman Registration Act. Peter Parker is living at Aunt May's house while he searches for an affordable apartment. Peter decides to check in on the Daily Bugle, to discover that the Bugle is suffering from extreme financial difficulties. J. Jonah Jameson suffers a heart attack, due to stress.

In light of the Bugles financial difficulties, Robbie Robertson asks Peter to do what he can to get Spider-Man pictures that he believes would boost circulation, which convinces Peter to return to the web-slinging. Robbie is finally getting on top of things as Dexter Bennett, a celebrity businessman, arrives to inform him that he's bought all of Jameson's Bugle shares and is now running operations.

After encountering supervillain Menace, Peter is concerned that Harry might have returned to his goblin-glider ways, but Harry's girlfriend, Lily Hollister, provides an alibi.

Mary Jane Watson, Bobby Carr, and Jackpot
It is established that Mary Jane and Peter were in a long-term relationship, but things ended badly, and their relationship is now frosty at best. As far as Peter (or anyone else) remembers, he and Mary Jane did not get married, but cohabited as a couple since the day of the aborted wedding. It is unclear whether Mary Jane has an awareness of her previous marriage to Peter, and their deal with Mephisto.

In one conversation, Spider-Man asks, "Do I know you?", to which MJ responds, "We've met. In another life." Spider-Man is not aware it is MJ he is speaking to; she is concealing her identity as per her current boyfriend's (film star Bobby Carr) wishes. 
However, based on their dialog from "One Moment In Time", neither MJ nor Peter seem to have any recollection of the deal.

Spider-Man speculates that Mary Jane Watson may be the new registered superhero Jackpot. Jackpot herself tells Spider-Man that her real name is Sara Ehret, but when Spider-Man visits this woman, she denies all knowledge of this. Sara is later seen approaching Mary Jane at the airport for an autograph.

Cast

New supporting castCarlie Cooper - A very close lifelong friend of Lily Hollister, Carlie works as a forensics expert in the crime scene unit. New to her job, she shows interest in the more "exotic" cases, but has to start at the bottom. Her father is Ray Cooper, a deceased cop who was well respected by his peers. While preparing a body found in the river for the Medical Examiner, she finds a spider-tracer in its mouth, which initiates the police warrant for the "Spider-Tracer Killer" (believed by most to be Spider-Man).

She is kidnapped by Dr. Rabin, an insane professor intent on using human sacrifices to appease an ancient Mayan god. He drags a bound and gagged Carlie out into a blizzard and attempts to murder her and offer her to the god, but she is saved when Spider-Man arrives and defeats Rabin.Dexter Bennett - The new owner of the Daily Bugle, which he renames the DB. He has a personal vendetta against both Spider-Man and Peter Parker, which leads Peter and Robbie Robertson to leave the paper.Lily Hollister - Harry Osborn's girlfriend. Her father, Bill Hollister, is running for the Mayoralty of New York, chiefly at her insistence. As the supervillain Menace, she is the most recent goblin to become an enemy of Spider-Man, with a particular interest in the Mayoral elections.Vin Gonzales - He works for the NYPD, and hates Spider-Man, thinking that the webhead is up to no good. However, his friend Al O'Neil, who also works for the NYPD, disagrees. Peter moves into Vin's apartment and becomes his roommate . When Peter resigns from the DB, he doesn't want Vin to know, because he fears Vin would think he was rooming with a flake. When he does find out he is furious that Peter lied to him; however, they have since reconciled.

Other charactersRyan Maxwell - A construction worker who is knocked off a platform by Menace while changing the sign on the exterior of the Daily Bugle building. Spider-Man arrives to catch Bill, but Ryan's neck is injured in the process. Ryan later approaches the lawyer Matt Dowd, asking if he can sue Spider-Man for knocking him off a building.  Dowd tells him that because his identity is unknown, they can file a "John Doe" complaint and serve him by publication; if he doesn't respond, they get a default judgment against him.Bruno Karnelli - The overweight son of a Karnelli and a Manfredi, who credits his parents' marriage with bringing the two crime families together, although he is offended that he has not been invited to their big meeting. He makes a deal with Mister Negative, who promises to make Bruno head of both families. After Sean Boyle accidentally plants a spider-tracer on him, Spider-Man follows him (hoping it will lead him back to Boyle) as he is pulled into a blue van and kidnapped. Bruno is tied to a table by Mister Negative and his Inner Demons as they extract a large amount of blood from him, until they are interrupted by Spider-Man, who lets them escape in order to save Bruno. Spider-Man believes that the only way Bruno would become leader of the crime families is if all other candidates for the job are killed, which makes Bruno realize that this has been Mister Negative's plan all along. Bruno then tells Spider-Man where to find them.

New villainsSean Boyle - This crook insulted Spider-Man by wearing a mask resembling his while committing crimes; he came to be known as the "Spider-Mugger". Boyle steals several wallets, including Peter Parker's and, accidentally, one of his Spider-Man webshooters. He attempts to sell the device to his fence, Dooley, at the Blind Spot (a waterfront bar for crooks), but Dooley considers the webshooter useless and returns it. When Boyle puts it on only to discover what it actually is, he accidentally shoots a spider-tracer onto the back of Bruno Karnelli, who is also at the bar. Boyle hides this from Dooley and starts using the webshooter to restrain his victims, until he realises that he must have stolen it from the real Spider-Man and one of the wallets he's given to Dooley contains his ID. He returns to the Blind Spot and asks for it to be returned, attacking Dooley with webbing, but Dooley turns it around on him and starts strangling Boyle with it. Later on, as Dooley drives off, Spider-Man finds Boyle's lifeless body with the webshooter and tracer still on him. Gonzales and O'Neil witness Spider-Man doing this and assume he has murdered Boyle.Overdrive - Introduced in Free Comic Book Day's Swing Shift, this villain can "pimp out any ride", using nanites to control and reshape any vehicle he manages to steal. Claiming to be Spider-Man's biggest fan, he often remolds cars into replicas of his old Spider-Mobile.Mister Negative - Martin Li, caring owner of a homeless shelter, has a dark secret: he can switch to a "negative mode", becoming a crime boss.Freak - After ingesting drugs and the Lizard's stem-cell research specimens, an addict morphs into a mammal-like being. Unlike the Lizard, Freak has his own mind when transformed and is obsessed with getting high. When nearly killed, Freak enters a metamorphosis state inside a cocoon and hatches in a significantly mutated form; he now cannot be defeated the same way as before.Paper Doll''' - A teenaged girl who is obsessed with actor Bobby Carr. She dresses like a goth, and has blue skin and the power to become paper thin and blend into backgrounds. She targets people who slander Bobby Carr and compresses them into her paper thin condition, thus killing them.

In other media
 An episode of Marvel's Spider-Man titled "Brand New Day" is somewhat of a reference to the "Brand New Day" comic series, as it marks the beginning of a new story arc within the show's second season. The biggest difference is that the episode takes place after the "Superior Spider-Man" story arc rather than one based on "One More Day". Additionally, Mr. Negative, Overdrive, and Screwball appear in minor roles in various episodes.
 The 2018 video game Spider-Man takes some elements of Martin Li / Mister Negative's plan to wipe out rival crime gangs and use of the "Devil's Breath" bioweapon although here a part of his scheme is to take revenge on the creator, Norman Osborn, who inadvertently killed Li's parents as a child by injecting and exposing Li with the serum that caused an unstable reaction.
 The Marvel Cinematic Universe film Spider-Man: No Way Home'' features elements from the comic when at the end, Dr. Stephen Strange conducts a reversal spell to make the world forget the public unmasking of Peter Parker as Spider-Man which includes his best friend Ned Leeds and girlfriend MJ, although his aunt May - who was killed by Green Goblin earlier in the film - is still dead. Unlike the comics, Peter's girlfriend MJ had forgotten Peter.

See also
 "Kraven's Last Hunt"
 "New Ways to Die"
 "One Moment in Time"
 "Big Time"
 List of issues

References

External links
 Fanboyradio interview with Dan Slott on Spider-Man: Brand New Day 
 Newsarama: Review for all "Brand New Day" issues

2008 comics debuts
2008 comics endings